John Adam Kasson (January 11, 1822 – May 18, 1910) was a nineteenth-century lawyer, politician and diplomat from south-central Iowa. Elected to the U.S. House six times, he repeatedly interrupted his congressional service to serve in the Diplomatic service in many different capacities.

Biography
He was born in Charlotte, Vermont, on January 11, 1822, to John Steele Kasson and Nancy Blackman. Kasson attended local school as a child and later graduated from the University of Vermont in 1842. He studied law and was admitted to the bar, commencing practice in St. Louis, Missouri. He moved to Des Moines, Iowa, in 1857 and commenced practice there.

He was a delegate to the Republican National Convention in 1860, where he quickly rose to a position of great influence.  Appointed as Iowa's representative on the platform committee, he was one of five delegates on the subcommittee responsible for reconciling competing resolutions into a coherent platform, and in the end was the principal draftsman of the final product, including the antislavery planks that were referenced by southern states as they seceded upon Abraham Lincoln's election.  In 1861, President Lincoln appointed Kasson as First Assistant Postmaster General, a position he held until August 1862.

In 1862, Kasson was elected a Republican to represent Iowa's new 5th congressional district in the United States House of Representatives.  His district included 22 counties in the southwestern quadrant of Iowa, including the city of Des Moines.  He represented that district for two terms, from 1863 to 1867. There, he served as chairman of the United States House Committee on Coinage, Weights, and Measures from 1863 to 1867, during which time the Metric Act of 1866, which he drafted, was passed. He was a commissioner from the United States to the International Postal Congress in Paris, France, in 1863. 
However, in 1866 he lost the Republican nomination to Civil War and Indian Campaign General Grenville M. Dodge.  Afterward, he was a commissioner from the United States to negotiate postal conventions with Great Britain, France, Belgium, the Netherlands, Germany, Switzerland and Italy in 1867.

In 1868 he was elected to the Iowa House of Representatives, where he served until 1872.  That year he was returned to the U.S. House to represent Iowa's new 7th congressional district, made up of ten counties in south-central Iowa.  He represented that district in Congress for four years, serving from 1873 to 1877.  He did not seek renomination in 1876, even though the New York Times reported that summer that he would have "good chances of success" as a candidate to become the next Speaker of the House.

In 1877 Kasson was appointed Envoy Extraordinary and Minister Plenipotentiary to Austria-Hungary by President Rutherford B. Hayes, a position he held until early 1881. At his suggestion, the four dollar Stella pattern coins were minted in 1879 and 1880.

In 1880 he ran once again for Congress, again winning the Republican nomination and general election to represent Iowa's 7th congressional district in the U.S. House.  Once again, he was re-elected.  His final period in Congress ended in 1884, when he was appointed Envoy and Head of the U.S. Legation at Berlin, Germany, by President Chester A. Arthur. He served in that position until 1885, when he was named as a special envoy to the Congo Conference in Berlin. He was also a special envoy to the Samoan International Conference in 1889. Kasson was a special commissioner plenipotentiary from the United States to negotiate reciprocity treaties in 1897 and was a member of the United States and British Joint High Commission to adjust differences with Canada in 1898.

Kasson died in Washington, D.C., on May 18, 1910, and was interred in Woodland Cemetery in Des Moines.

References

External links
 Retrieved on 2009-5-12
Men of Mark in America Biography

1822 births
1910 deaths
People from Charlotte, Vermont
Republican Party members of the Iowa House of Representatives
Ambassadors of the United States to Austria-Hungary
Ambassadors of the United States to Germany
19th-century American diplomats
Iowa lawyers
Missouri lawyers
Politicians from Des Moines, Iowa
Lawyers from St. Louis
People of Iowa in the American Civil War
University of Vermont alumni
United States Postal Service people
Republican Party members of the United States House of Representatives from Iowa
19th-century American politicians
Politicians from St. Louis
19th-century American lawyers
Burials at Woodland Cemetery (Des Moines, Iowa)